Alessandro Pepoli (1757–1796), was an Italian librettist and author of tragedies.

Born in Venice, Pepoli sought to be considered a literary rival to Vittorio Alfieri, often writing his own takes on topics previously addressed by Alfieri. Styling himself as a champion of liberty, in 1783, he wrote an essay on freedom, advocating political reform.

Other noted works include:

 Anna Bolena, a libretto recounting the life of Anne Boleyn, the second wife of England's King Henry VIII. Similar treatments were done in the same period by Felice Romani (Anna Bolena) and Ippolito Pindemonte (Enrico VIII ossia Anna Bolena).
 A libretto for an opera by Giovanni Paisiello entitled I giuochi d'Agrigento with which the theater, La Fenice, was inaugurated on 16 May 1792.
 A six-page summary translation of John Milton's Paradise Lost, Prospetto del "Paradiso Perduto" di Giovanni Milton Tradotto in versi sciolti da Alessandro Pepoli, printed in Venice in 1795.
 A tragedy Agamennone published in Venice in 1794 and rival of the tragedy with the same subject of Alfieri

References

External links
 Alessandro Pèpoli at www.ariannaeditrice.it
 John A. Rice, "Opera Seria in Theory and Practice: Alessandro Pepoli's 'Letter ad un uomo ragionevole sul melodramma detto serio' (1790) and His Libretto for Paisiello's I giuochi d'Agrigento (1792)

1757 births
1796 deaths
Italian librettists
Italian male writers
18th-century Venetian writers